Taranenko is a gender-neutral Ukrainian surname. Notable people with the surname include:

 Iryna Taranenko-Terelia (born 1966), Ukrainian cross-country skier
 Ivan Taranenko (1912–1995), Soviet fighter pilot
 Leonid Taranenko (born 1956), Belarusian weightlifter

See also
 

Ukrainian-language surnames